Lobos de la Universidad Latina de México is a football club that plays in the Liga Premier de México – Serie A. It is based in the city of Celaya, Mexico.

History
On March 12, 2021, an agreement was signed between Celaya F.C. and the Universidad Latina de México with the objective of establishing a football team that would participate in the Liga Premier de México, which would bear the name of the university but would be based on the franchise that the club already had in that league.

In April 2021, the university board made official the project to build a stadium to host the institution's soccer and football games, which will have a capacity to hold 1,200 spectators.

The team was officially entered into soccer competitions on July 30, 2021, when its entry into the Liga Premier – Serie A was announced, the club was placed in Group 2 of this category.

On August 3, Rowan Vargas was announced as the club's first manager. The following day the first players of the team were announced: Alejandro Padua, Ricardo Chávez, Rafael Rodea and Rogelio Calixto.

Stadium
The team will have the option of playing its home games in two stadiums, the first of which is the Estadio Miguel Alemán Valdés, that is the Celaya F.C. ground and may be used by Lobos ULMX due to its status as an affiliated team, this stadium has a capacity for 23,182. The second field of the club will be the Estadio de la ULM, which will have a capacity to accommodate 1,200 spectators and will be inaugurated in 2021 to host American and association football matches.

Players

Current squad

References

Association football clubs established in 2021
Football clubs in Celaya
2021 establishments in Mexico
Liga Premier de México